William Veazie Pratt (28 February 1869 – 25 November 1957) was an admiral in the United States Navy. He served as the President of the Naval War College from 1925 to 1927, and as the 5th Chief of Naval Operations from 1930 to 1933.

Early life
William V. Pratt was born in Belfast, Maine. He was the son of Nichols Pratt, who served in the Union Navy during the American Civil War with the rank of acting master.

Naval career

After graduating from the United States Naval Academy in 1889, Pratt served in several cruisers and gunboats, visiting Europe, South America and Asia. During 1895–97, Ensign Pratt had the first of three instructor tours at the Naval Academy. He was assigned to the gunboat  during the Spanish–American War and to the cruiser  afterwards. While in the latter, he returned to Asiatic waters, where he saw action in the Philippine–American War. A second Naval Academy session followed in 1900–1902, after which he served in the North Atlantic Fleet flagship .

Lieutenant Commander Pratt's final Naval Academy tour took place in 1905–1908. Promoted to the rank of commander in 1910, Pratt was an instructor at the Naval War College in 1911–1913 and spent the next two years in the Atlantic Torpedo Flotilla, much of that as commanding officer of its flagship, the scout cruiser . Captain Pratt was assigned to the United States Army in Panama and at the Army War College in 1915–1917. During World War I he served in Washington, D.C. as Assistant Chief of Naval Operations in 1918.

Pratt was at sea in 1919–1921 as commanding officer of the battleship  and as Commander Destroyer Force, Pacific Fleet. Following promotion to rear admiral in mid-1921, he was a member of the General Board in Washington, D.C., and served as a technical advisor during the negotiations that led to the Washington Naval Limitations Treaty of February 1922. He commanded a battleship division in 1923–1925 and was president of the court of inquiry that examined the 8 September 1923 Honda Point Disaster. Assignments followed to the General Board and as president of the Naval War College. In 1927, he returned to sea as Commander Battleship Divisions, Battle Fleet. A year later, he became Commander Battle Fleet in the rank of admiral and in 1929–1930 was commander in chief of United States Fleet.

Pratt's work with the U.S. Fleet was interrupted in early 1930 by a trip to England to participate in the London conference that further limited the size of the world's major navies. He became Chief of Naval Operations in September 1930 and spent nearly three years in that post, during a time when Depression-era demands for economy made it very difficult to maintain the Navy's size and readiness. During his tenure, he also helped Coast Guard Commandant Harry G. Hamlet in discouraging President Franklin D. Roosevelt from merging the Navy and Coast Guard.  Pratt agreed with President Herbert Hoovers's emphasis on disarmament and went along with postponement of new construction and cutting the fleet.  Other naval officers disagreed sharply with Hoover's policies.

Later life

Retired at the beginning of July 1933, Pratt lived thereafter in Maine and New York City. During World War II, he wrote a regular column for a nationally circulated magazine and spent several months on active Navy Department duty in 1941 studying measures to counter the German submarine threat. Pratt died in 1957.

Like his father, Pratt was a companion of the District of Columbia Commandery of the Military Order of the Loyal Legion of the United States.

Legacy
In 1960, the destroyer USS William V. Pratt (DLG-13, later DDG-44) was named in honor of Admiral Pratt.

References

External links
 Admiral William Veazie Pratt, U. S. Navy (book by Gerald E. Wheeler)
 Photos 
William V. Pratt Memoirs, 1939 MS 514 held by Special Collections & Archives, Nimitz Library at the United States Naval Academy

1869 births
1957 deaths
United States Navy personnel of World War I
People from Belfast, Maine
Military personnel from Maine
United States Naval Academy alumni
Presidents of the Naval War College
United States Navy admirals
Chiefs of Naval Operations
Naval War College faculty
Naval War College alumni
Recipients of the Distinguished Service Medal (US Army)
Recipients of the Navy Distinguished Service Medal